Albania competed at the 1996 Summer Olympics in Atlanta. It was only the third appearance of the European nation, which made its Olympic debut in 1972.

Athletics

Women

Cycling

Shooting

Women

Weightlifting

Wrestling

References
 sports-reference

Nations at the 1996 Summer Olympics
1996
1996 in Albanian sport